The Game Boy Sound System (GBS) is a file format containing Nintendo Game Boy sound driver data designed for the Game Boy sound hardware.

GBS rips are an arduous task often involving debuggers and compiled assembly code, as there was no uniform sound driver for each Game Boy game. As a result, GBS players and the files themselves emulate just enough of the original hardware and ROM data to play back the music driver and data.

Players
Kobarin Media Player - Includes a front end, supports GBS and many chiptune formats natively, has a Winamp plugin converter.
Audacious - *nix player that accepts GBS.
Chipamp - Winamp plug-in bundle compiled by OverClocked ReMix allowing playback of over 40 chiptune and tracker formats
gbsplay - Open source player (Linux, *nix) (and XMMS plugin in older versions)
NEZPlug++ - Winamp plug-in that currently supports the most up-to-date implementation of the GBS format. 
Audio Overload - A media player capable of playing a variety of audio formats from vintage consoles and computers.
Noise Entertainment System - a NSF/e (NES Sound File), GBS, VGM and SPC player for the iPhone and iPod touch.
VLC Media Player

References

Digital audio
Video game music file formats